Absolutely was the second rock music album recorded by the band Boxer, released during 1977 on the Epic record label. Singer/pianist Mike Patto had assembled a new-look lineup including bassist Tim Bogert from Vanilla Fudge, guitarist Adrian Fisher from Sparks, Chris Stainton from Joe Cocker and many others and drummer Eddie Tuduri from the American band Wha-Koo.

The album was also released in the U.S. with a different cover.

There had been rumours that George Martin was interested in working with Boxer. The album was eventually produced by Jeff Glixman, who had worked with the Allman Brothers and Kansas.

Patto collaborated with all the band members to write the songs on this album.  "Rich Man's Daughter" is a reworking of the same song recorded by the Boxer lineup for Bloodletting, which was recorded in 1976. This album was the last recording made by Patto.

Track listing 
"A Fool in Love" (Tim Bogert, Mike Patto) 4:08		
"Red Light Flyer" (Patto) 3:54		
"Big Lucy" (Bogert, Chris Stainton, Patto) 3:58		
"No Reply" (Stainton, Patto) 5:20		
"Can't Stand What You Do" (Bogert, Stainton, Patto, Adrian Fisher, Eddie Tuduri) 3:58		
"As God's My Judge" (Stainton, Patto) 3:10		
"Rich Man's Daughter" (Patto) 4:04
"Everybody's a Star"  (Stainton, Patto)	2:32
"Hand on Your Heart" (Bogert, Stainton, Patto, Fisher, Tuduri) 4:43

Band personnel 
Mike Patto – lead vocals, piano
Adrian Fisher – guitar
Chris Stainton – keyboards
Tim Bogert – bass, backing vocals
Eddie Tuduri – drums

Technical personnel 
Assistant Engineer: Tori Swenson
Mixed at Village Recorders (L.A)
Assistant Engineer: Terry Diane Becker 	
Mastered by George Marino at Sterling Sound (N.Y). 
Design and Photography by Herbert W. Worthington
Logo: Jack Upston

Re-issues 
Virgin 1997
EMI 2000

Notes

Literature
Strong, M.C. The great rock discography. Giunti (1998).

External links
http://www.discogs.com/release/773313

1977 albums
Boxer (band) albums
Albums produced by Jeff Glixman
Virgin Records albums
EMI Records albums
Epic Records albums